Mary Benson may refer to:

 Mary Benson (campaigner) (1919–2000), South African civil rights campaigner and author
 Mary Benson (hostess) (1841–1918), English hostess 
 Mary Knight Benson (1877–1930), Native American basket maker
 Mary Josephine Benson, Canadian poet and journalist